Scrobipalpa burmanni is a moth in the family Gelechiidae. It was described by Povolný in 1971. It is found in Tunisia.

The forewings range from light to dark brown. The hindwings are grey.

References

Scrobipalpa
Moths described in 1971